Alyssa Jacey (La Jolla, 1981) is an American singer-songwriter and dancer/choreographer. As an indie artist, Jacey self-publishes her work.

Biography 
Alyssa Jacey was born in La Jolla, a seaside neighborhood within the city of San Diego. She is a singer/songwriter and a dancer/choreographer, beginning her singing career in Los Angeles. She later moved to San Diego to finish college. Notably, she danced during the halftime show of the Super Bowl XXXVII. Her debut album Closed Eyes... ...Open Heart was released in 2005. In 2013 she was nominated for a Nashville Independent Music Award for "Best Live Country Performer(s)".

Style 
Jacey's work is categorized as pop/rap. John Apice of Americana Highways, a website dedicated to americana, reviewed her live album Alyssa LIVE! and noted that she likes to talk in between songs: "(...) her between-song banter is friendly & joyful in an early Joni Mitchell voice."

Discography

Studio albums 
 Closed eyes... ...open heart, 2005
 Here's to change, 2010
 On the spot, 2012
 Destined, 2014

EP's 
 Alyssa Jacey, 2005
 The soul, 2006
 Turning points, 2009
 Heart breathe, 2015

References

External links 
 Official website

American singer-songwriters
Living people
1981 births